Romania is one of the twenty-four participating countries and regions competing in the Turkvision Song Contest.

History

2013
Romania made its debut in the Turkvision Song Contest at the 2013 festival, in Eskişehir, Turkey. Alpha Media TV held a selection process to select their participant for the contest, a five-member jury selected Genghiz Erhan Cutcalai to represent Romania on their debut. "Ay Ak Shatir" was revealed as Romania's song on 18 December 2013. Romania performed 18th in the semi final but failed to qualify for the final.

2014
Romania participated again in the 2014 contest in Kazan, Tatarstan. Alpha Media TV selected their 2013 participant Genghiz Erhan Cutcalai to represent as part of a duet with Gafar Alev Sibel. In Kazan the duet sang "Genclik Basa Bir Gelir", they performed 22nd in the semi final but finished in 17th place on 158 points and did not qualify for the final.

2020
Romania participated for a fourth time in the 2020 contest with the song "Niye?" by Sunai Giolacai, who was previously selected for the 2016 contest before its cancellation. Romania finished in 22nd with 167 points.

Participation overview

References 

Countries in the Turkvision Song Contest
Turkvision